Topraklı is a village in the İdil District of Şırnak Province in Turkey. The village is populated by Kurds of the Dorikan tribe and had a population of 393 in 2021.

The hamlet of Böcekli is attached to Topraklı.

References 

Villages in İdil District
Kurdish settlements in Şırnak Province